Spiritual is the adjective for spirit.

Spiritual may also refer to:

Religion
Spirituality, a concern with matters of the spirit
Spiritual attack, an attack by Satan and his demons on a Christian
Spiritual body, a Christian term for resurrection
Spiritual but not religious, a religious categorization
Spiritual bypass, a "tendency to use spiritual ideas and practices to sidestep or avoid facing unresolved emotional issues, psychological wounds, and unfinished developmental tasks"
Spiritual communion, a Christian practice of desiring union with Jesus Christ in the Eucharist
Spiritual crisis, a form of identity crisis where an individual experiences drastic changes to their meaning system typically because of a spontaneous spiritual experience
Spiritual death, absence of spirituality
Spiritual development, the development of the personality towards a religious or spiritual desired better personality
Spiritual direction, the practice of being with people as they attempt to deepen their relationship with the divine, or to learn and grow in their own personal spirituality
Spiritual distress, a disturbance in a person's belief system
Spiritual ecology, a field in religion and environmentalism
Spiritual energy, a form of energy in spirituality and alternative medicine
Spiritual enlightenment, the "full comprehension of a situation"
Spiritual evolution, the philosophical, theological, esoteric or spiritual idea that nature and human beings evolve
Spiritual experience, a subjective experience in religion
Spiritual formation, the process and practices by which a person may progress in one's spiritual or religious life or to a movement in Protestantism
Spiritual gift, a supernatural power given by God
Spiritual healing, a form of alternative medicine
Spiritual intelligence, a term used by some philosophers, psychologists, and developmental theorists to indicate spiritual parallels with intelligence quotient and emotional quotient
Spiritual literature, a genre of literature, in which usually involves the personal spiritual experience of the author
Spiritual materialism, a Tibetan Buddhist concept
Spiritual naturalism, a naturalist approach to spiritual ways of looking at the world
Spiritual opportunism, the exploitation of spiritual ideas for personal gain, partisan interests or selfish motives
Spiritual philosophy, a philosophy pertaining to spirituality
Spiritual possession, a concept of many religions, where it is believed that a spirit may take temporary control of a human body   
Spiritual practice, a way of exercising spirituality
Spiritual psychology, a school of psychology that integrates the spiritual and transcendent aspects of the human experience with the framework of modern psychology
Spiritual reading, a practice of reading books and articles about spirituality with the purpose of growing in holiness
Spiritual retreat, a place or state dedicated to spirituality
Spiritual test, a life situation, provided by God, to evaluate man's individual moral character and obedience to his laws
Spiritual transformation, a fundamental change in a person's sacred or spiritual life
Spiritual warfare, the Christian concept of fighting against the work of preternatural evil forces
Spiritual warrior, a term used in Tibetan Buddhism for one who combats the ignorance (avidyā)
Spirituals, a branch of the 13th-century Franciscans espousing poverty as obligatory
Spiritual Franciscans, extreme proponents of the rule of Saint Francis of Assisi, especially with regard to poverty 
Lords Spiritual, the clergy of the established Church of England who serve in the House of Lords
Spiritual Baptists, a syncretic Afro-American religion that combines elements of traditional African religion with Christianity
Spiritual Christianity, a Christian denomination in Russia
Spiritual church movement, a group of Spiritualist churches and Spiritualist denominations

Music
Spiritual (music), an African American song, usually with a Christian religious text
The Spiritual, a 1969 album by the Art Ensemble of Chicago
"Spiritual", a song by Katy Perry from her 2013 album Prism

Other uses
Spiritual successor, a follow-up work that does not directly continue the canon of its predecessor

See also
Spirit (disambiguation)
Spirit world (disambiguation)
Spiritualism (disambiguation)